Group Analysis is a peer-reviewed academic journal that publishes papers four times a year in the field of Group Studies. The journal's editor is Dieter Nitzgen. It has been in publication since 1967 and is currently published by SAGE Publications on behalf of Group Analytic Society International. The Society also publishes a newsletter, Group Analytic Contexts edited by Peter Zelaskowski. Past issues are available for download from the link below.

Scope 
Group Analysis aims to explore the theory, practice and experience of analytical group dynamics. The journal covers areas such as psychoanalytic psychology, social psychology and anthropology, providing an interdisciplinary forum for discussion among practitioners, theoreticians and researchers.

Abstracting and indexing 
Group Analysis is abstracted and indexed in the following databases:
 Academic Premier
 Business Source Premier
 British Education Index
 Current Contents: Social and Behavioral Sciences
 Educational Research Abstracts Online
 SciVal
 SCOPUS
 Social Sciences Citation Index (Impact Factor pending)

External links
 
Group Analytic Contexts

SAGE Publishing academic journals
English-language journals